31st was a station on the Chicago Transit Authority's South Side Main Line, which is now part of the Green Line. The station was located at 31st Street near State Street in the Douglas neighborhood of Chicago. 31st was situated south of 29th and north of 33rd. 31st opened on June 6, 1892, and closed on August 1, 1949.

References

Defunct Chicago "L" stations
Railway stations in the United States opened in 1892
Railway stations closed in 1949
1892 establishments in Illinois
1949 disestablishments in Illinois
Railway stations in Chicago